Tibú is a municipality and town of Colombia located in the department of Norte de Santander, in the northeast of the country, on the border with Venezuela and on the banks of the Tibú River. It is the 160th most populated town of Colombia, and the 6th in the department after Cúcuta, Ocaña, Villa del Rosario, Los Patios and Pamplona. It has an airport, and is connected by national road with Cúcuta, Ocaña and El Tarra.

History

The area of present-day Tibú was originally inhabited by the Barí people. Oil companies established a camp when they first arrived in the area in 1945. On March 8, 1945, the Council of Cúcuta approved the creation of the corregimiento of Tibu. The Catholic Church also established the San Luis Beltran Mission and later on May 25, 1952, established the parish. The church greatly contributed to the development of the village by designing the first streets and distributing lots for the first houses and the cathedral.

It was erected municipality later on January 1, 1977, in the midst of the jungle of the Catatumbo Region an almost human inhospitable land between Colombian and Venezuela.

The town and municipalities were severely hit by the Colombian Civil War (1960s–present). The area has been a constant dispute between government forces, the guerrillas of the FARC and ELN and paramilitary groups. On June 16, 1996 AUC members perpetrated the Gabarra Massacre while struggling for control of the area with insurgents.

Geography

The municipality of Tibú borders to the east with the Bolivarian Republic of Venezuela, to the south with the municipalities of Cúcuta and Sardinata, to the west with El Tarra and San Calixto and to the northwest with Teorama.

References

External links
 Tibú official website

Municipalities of the Norte de Santander Department